The Bayou Meto Battlefield is a battlefield site of the American Civil War in Jacksonville, Arkansas.  It is the location of the August 27, 1863 Battle of Bayou Meto, in which Confederate forces successfully prevented Union Army forces from crossing the Bayou Meto River during their advance to capture Little Rock.  The battlefield is located on both sides of the river, on either side of Arkansas Highway 161, whose bridge is the location of the 1863 Reed's Bridge.  A portion of the battlefield is now preserved as Reed's Bridge Battlefield Heritage Park.  The entire battlefield is the best-preserved of the three major battle sites of the Union advance on Little Rock.  A  area covering the core of the battlefield was listed on the National Register of Historic Places in 2002.

See also
National Register of Historic Places listings in Pulaski County, Arkansas

References

Conflict sites on the National Register of Historic Places in Arkansas
Protected areas of Pulaski County, Arkansas
Battlefields of the Western Theater of the American Civil War
National Register of Historic Places in Pulaski County, Arkansas
American Civil War on the National Register of Historic Places
Jacksonville, Arkansas